RPCS may stand for:

 Roland Park Country School
 Refined Printing Command Stream
 Reformed Presbyterian Church of Scotland